Rendeux is a municipality of Wallonia located in the province of Luxembourg, Belgium. 

On 1 January 2007 the municipality, which covers 68.83 km2, had 2,274 inhabitants, giving a population density of 33 inhabitants per km2.

The municipality consists of the following districts: Beffe, and Rendeux.

The village of Rendeux lies in the valley of the River Ourthe in an area which attracts visitors both for its natural environment (Rendeux is home to the Robert Lenoir Arboretum) and for such nearby medieval villages as La Roche and Durbuy.

Notable residents
 Theroigne de Mericourt (1762–1817), singer and revolutionary, born in Marcourt

References

External links

 
Municipalities of Luxembourg (Belgium)